Patrick Haas (born May 1, 1993) is an Austrian footballer who currently plays as a midfielder for FCM Traiskirchen.

Career

SV Leobendorf
In December 2019 it was confirmed, that Haas would join SV Leobendorf on 1 January 2020.

References

External links
 

1993 births
Living people
Austrian footballers
SV Horn players
SC Ostbahn XI players
Floridsdorfer AC players
First Vienna FC players
FK Austria Wien players
SK Rapid Wien players
Austrian Regionalliga players
2. Liga (Austria) players
Association football midfielders
Footballers from Vienna
Austria youth international footballers